Protalphadon is a genus of small mammal from the late Cretaceous. Its fossils are found in Utah, Montana, New Jersey, South Dakota, Wyoming and Colorado. Originally the genus was assigned to Alphadon.

Description
Protalphadon is known from a few fossils but mainly teeth. It was likely omnivorous.

References

Prehistoric metatherians
Extinct mammals of North America
Hell Creek fauna
Prehistoric mammal genera